Thomas Rusch (born October 10, 1962 in Freiburg im Breisgau)  is a German photographer living in Berlin, Hamburg and Paris.

Life and work
After finishing school, Thomas Rusch moved to Hamburg in 1981 to start his education as photographer. His first publication was a series of portraits at Schleswig-Holstein Musik Festival published in weekly magazine Stern. This was followed by a long-term cooperation with Stern, in which Thomas Rusch published many reportages, portraits and cover pictures. At the end of the 1990s Thomas Rusch's portraits of well-known celebrities were published in magazines like Zeitmagazin, Der Spiegel, Max and GQ. At the same time, Rusch showed his artistical work, e.g. Paradise Lost, Cirque O, and Die Ecke (The Corner), in price-winning exhibitions around the world.

From the late 1990s on, Thomas Rusch lived in Paris. He worked as a beauty- and fashion photographer and published his work in indie publications like Soon, Tank, and Oyster, as well as in numerous international fashion- and lifestyle magazines. Rusch shot campaigns (e.g. for Ray Ban, Beck's, Seat) and developed his own artistical projects.

Since 2006, Thomas Rusch is commuting between Paris, Hamburg and Berlin. He is still working for editorials and advertising, but at the same time he is focussing on his work as an artist. In his freelanced projects, Thomas Rusch is concerned with the subjects of sexuality, representation of women in western society, and fetishism. He likes to examine their ambivalent qualities between the private and the public, art and commerce - oscillating between a clear emphasis on naturalness and an exaggeration of superficiality. His last exhibitions were focussing on themes like masks (Behind, 2010, portraits of faces with heavy make-up) and skin (A Fleur de Peau, 2014, studies on the subject of skin)

Exhibitions
 2014 A Fleur de Peau, Bettina von Arnim Gallery, Paris
 2013 Bettina von Arnim Gallery, Paris
 2010 Behind, Stageback Gallery, Shanghai
 2009 Homage to Irving Penn, Galerie Hiltawsky, Hamburg/Berlin
 2008 Play, Galerie Chappe, Paris
 2002 Die Ästhetik der Lüste, Fotomuseum Leipzig
 2002 Icon, Aplanat Galerie, Hamburg
 2001 Jolis Momes, Acte 2, Paris
 2000 Die Ästhetik der Lüste, Fotomuseum Leipzig
 1996 Erotik in Deutschland, Museum für Kunst und Gewerbe, Hamburg
 1995-2012 Bildermode – Modebilder. German fashion photography. Curated by F.C. Gundlach, stations in New York, Milan, Taipei, Seoul, Tokyo, Beijing, Hong Kong, Singapore, Lisbon, a.o.
 1995 Die Ecke, Image-Kastannus Oy, Helsinki
 1994 Zeitgeist Becomes Form, Goethe-Institut, New York
 1993 Paradise Lost, Kulturzentrum Gasteig, Munich
 1993 Alexandra S., Deutsche Fototage, Frankfurt
 1992 Internationaler Salon für Fotografie + Design, Cologne
 1992 Die Ecke, Galerie Rahmel – 17 Subway Stations, Cologne
 1992 Paradise Lost, PPS Galerie F.C. Gundlach, Sheila Metzner + Thomas Rusch, Hamburg
 1992 Paradise Lost, Museo Ken Damy, Brescia
 1991 Modewelten, Museum für Kunst und Gewerbe, Hamburg
 1990 Paradise Lost, Museum House of Painters, Moscow
 1987 Schleswig-Holstein Musik Festival, Grauwert Galerie, Hamburg

Awards
 4x Art Directors Club, Germany
 Art Directors Club of Europe
 2008 SPD Award, New York
 2006 FWA Red Dot Award
 2004 Canon ProFashional Photo Award
 1992 Kodak Portrait Award
 1991, 1987 Kodak European Award

Collections 
 Second Bert Hartkamp Collection, Amsterdam
 F.C. Gundlach Collection, Hamburg
 Museum für Kunst und Gewerbe, Hamburg
 The Finnish Museum of Photography, Helsinki
 Museo Ken Damy, Brescia

Literature
 2010 Thomas Rusch. The Artificial Face – mask and masquerade, in: Eyemazing, Issue 3, 2010. ASIN: B00510IC4A
 2010 Blink Magazine. Contemporary Photography, No. 5, 
 2010 Blink Magazine. Contemporary Photography, No. 1
 2006 All Allure, edited by Robert Klanten, Berlin, Die Gestalten Verlag. 
 2002 Thomas Rusch - Icon, with texts by Hellmut Karasek and Wolfgang Behnken, Hamburg, Aplanat Edition. 
 1997 Surrealities, edited by Andreas Peyerl, Robert Klanten, Berlin, Die Gestalten Verlag. 
 1995 Bildermode – Modebilder. Deutsche Modephotographien von 1945 bis 1995, edited Wulf Herzogenrath, with texts by F.C. Gundlach, K. Honnef, E. Kaufold, Berlin, IFA. ASIN: B00B59NXOK
 1992 Thomas Rusch - Paradise Lost, with text by Shuhei Takahashi, Tokio, Treville. 
 1988 Sinfonien in Herrenhäusern und Scheunen. Das Schleswig-Holstein Musik Festival, edited by Werner Burkhardt et al., Hamburg, Rasch und Röhring Verlag.

External links 
 http://www.thomasrusch.org
 http://www.thomasrusch.com
 http://www.galeriebettina.com

References

1962 births
Living people
Photographers from Baden-Württemberg
Artists from Freiburg im Breisgau
21st-century German photographers